KILL is the sixth album by Detroit rock band Electric Six, which was released in October 2009.

Release 
Prior to its release, the working title for the album was Sign of the Beefcarver, named after a restaurant in Detroit.

The album was released by Metropolis Records on October 20, 2009. A music video for the album's opening track, Body Shot, was released earlier in the same month.

The cross-stitch cover art for KILL was produced by Detroit artist/writer Shannon McCarthy.

Track listing
All songs written by Tyler Spencer.

 "Body Shot" – 3:46
 "Waste of Time and Money" – 3:28
 "Egyptian Cowboy" – 4:20
 "Escape from Ohio" – 3:11
 "Rubbin' Me the Wrong Way" – 3:04
 "One Sick Puppy" – 2:53
 "Steal Your Bones" – 4:20
 "My Idea of Fun" – 3:17
 "I Belong in a Factory" – 2:32
 "The Newark Airport Boogie" – 3:00
 "Simulated Love" – 3:30
 "You're Bored" – 1:45
 "White Eyes" – 4:20

Personnel

Electric Six
 Dick Valentine – vocals
 Tait Nucleus? – synthesizer
 The Colonel – guitar
  – guitar
 Smörgåsbord – bass
 Percussion World – drums

Additional musicians
 John R. Dequindre – bass on track 5
 Kristin von Bernthal – background vocals on track 7
 Matt Aljian – timpani on track 7
 Korin Louise Visocchi – background vocals on track 11

Legacy
 "The Newark Airport Boogie" was included on a charity fund-raising album, The Haiti Project, which was released to raise money to aide relief efforts related to the 2010 Haiti earthquake. Other artists on this release included The Wildhearts and Eureka Machines.
 A demo version of "White Eyes" was subsequently made available online via the band's SoundCloud page after, initially, being announced for inclusion on their Mimicry and Memories album but later being omitted.
 Dick Valentine recorded an acoustic version of "Steal Your Bones" for his solo album Quiet Time.
 Demos of "Waste of Time and Money", "Rubbin' Me the Wrong Way" and "I Belong in a Factory" were subsequently released on The Dick Valentine Raw Collection.
 The band performed a stripped-down version of "Steal Your Bones" on their third live album Chill Out!.

References

2009 albums
Electric Six albums
Metropolis Records albums